Freeset is a group of social enterprises focused on creating positive employment opportunities for women affected by sex trafficking in West Bengal, India. Freeset Bags & Apparel manufactures bags and T-shirts, Freeset Fabrics is a weaving business and Freeset Business Incubator is focused on facilitating the establishment of new freedom businesses.

Freeset Bags & Apparel is a fair trade freedom business, offering employment to approximately 200 women who were trapped in Kolkata's sex trade. Founded by Kerry and Annie Hilton in 2001, Freeset offers women of the Sonagacchi red-light district of Kolkata the opportunity to leave a profession they never chose.

Making jute and cotton bags as well as organic cotton T-shirts, the women of Freeset are empowered to choose a life free from prostitution. All profits from the business are used for the benefit of the women.

When they first start at Freeset, many women struggle to sew or even do simple tasks. It is not uncommon for new trainees to produce bags sewn inside out and upside down. The trauma they have experienced in their lives often makes learning difficult, so they easily forget what they have learned.

The jobs offered by Freeset allow women to experience financial independence and gain better access to both health care and educational opportunities for their children.

Freeset also employs a handful of men.

Freeset Business Incubator was created in 2011 to expand on the opportunities offered by Freeset Bags & Apparel. This takes the form of nurturing new freedom businesses, providing capacity and expertise to existing freedom businesses and recruiting people to join or start these social businesses focused on freedom. The Freedom Encounter is a 3-week starter course offered by the Incubator to introduce participants to the idea of freedom business and to expose them to the realities and possibilities of running a freedom business.

Freeset Fabrics was the first freedom business begun under the guidance of the Incubator.

Freeset Fabrics is the first Freeset freedom business to be established in a rural context. It is strategically located in the Murshidabad district of West Bengal, in an impoverished area known to be a source of young women trafficked for sex. The idea behind locating the business in this area is to provide economic opportunities for women who would otherwise be vulnerable to trafficking, thereby reducing their risk of being trafficked.

Weaving is a traditional skill among the people of the area and this influenced the decision to start a weaving business with an initial focus on making scarves. Training started in late 2014 and the first scarves came off the production line, mid 2015.

References

Sources
Cadacio, Jodeal (13/11/2009). "Freeing women from sex trade". North Shore Times.
Chanwai-Earle, Lynda (20/7/2015). "Freedom from Calcutta's sex slave trade - Freeset, India". Radio New Zealand National.

International human rights organizations
Fair trade
Social enterprises